The 1911 Detroit Tigers football team  was an American football team that represented the University of Detroit in the 1911 college football season. In its first season under head coach Royal R. Campbell, the team compiled a 4–4 record and was outscored by its opponents by a combined total of 53 to 41.

In January 1911, the school changed its name from "Detroit College" to the "University of Detroit".

Schedule

References

Detroit
Detroit Titans football seasons
Detroit Tigers football
Detroit Tigers football